A municipiu (from Latin municipium; English: municipality) is a level of administrative subdivision in Romania and Moldova, roughly equivalent to city in some English-speaking countries.

In Romania, this status is given to towns that are large and urbanized; at present, there are 103 municipii. There is no clear benchmark regarding the status of municipiu even though it applies to localities which have a sizeable population, usually above 15,000, and extensive urban infrastructure. Localities that do not meet these loose guidelines are classified only as towns (orașe), or if they are not urban areas, as communes (comune). Cities are governed by a mayor and local council. There are no official administrative subdivisions of cities even though, unofficially, municipalities may be divided into quarters/districts (cartiere in Romanian). The exception to this is Bucharest, which has a status similar to that of a county, and is officially subdivided into six administrative sectors.

In Moldova, which has thirteen municipii, a 2002 law provides that the status applies of cities that play an important role in the country's economic, social, cultural, scientific, political and administrative life.

Complete list

Romania

† lost status in 1938

Of the seventeen municipii created in 1925, three are no longer in Romania: Cernăuți, Cetatea Albă, and Chișinău. Additionally, Bălți became one in 1929; together with Cetatea Albă, it lost the title in 1938. Cluj and Oradea temporarily lost the title in 1940 as a result of the Second Vienna Award, while it was granted to Odessa and Tiraspol during the Transnistria Governorate period. The status was not used between 1950 and 1968, so that cities which lost it in 1950 were reassigned it in 1968. The most recent municipii were created in 2003.

Moldova

Chișinău, Tiraspol, Bălți, and Bender/Tighina have been municipii continuously since 1995, and Comrat since 1998. Cahul, Edineț, Hîncești, Orhei, Soroca, and Ungheni held the status from 1998 to 2002, and regained it in 2016. Additionally, Căușeni, Taraclia, Dubăsari, and Rîbnița held the status from 1998 to 2002.

References

 
 
Lists of subdivisions of Romania
Lists of subdivisions of Moldova
Administrative divisions in Europe